Juan R. Luciano (born c. 1962) is a US-based Argentine businessman. He serves as the chairman and chief executive officer of Archer Daniels Midland.

Early life
Luciano was born circa 1962 in Argentina. He grew up on a farm in Ramallo, Buenos Aires. He graduated from the Instituto Tecnológico de Buenos Aires, where he earned a bachelor's in industrial engineering.

Career
Luciano worked for Dow Chemical for 25 years.

Luciano currently serves as chairman and chief executive officer of Archer Daniels Midland, after joining as executive VP and COO in 2011 and being named president in 2014. He is a member of the board of directors for Eli Lilly and Company, and served as a non-executive director from 2012-2018 at Wilmar International, subsequently becoming an alternate director.

Luciano is a member of the Economic Club of Chicago, the Commercial Club of Chicago, the Business Roundtable, the US-China Business Council, the nonprofit Intersect Illinois, and he serves on the global advisory board of the Kellogg School of Management and is a trustee of the Boys and Girls Clubs of America.

References

Living people
1960s births
Argentine chairpersons of corporations
Argentine chief executives
Argentine expatriates in the United States
Argentine corporate directors
Archer Daniels Midland people